CURE Children's Hospital of Uganda (CCHU) is a specialized children's neurosurgery hospital in Uganda. It is a private hospital, owned and operated by CURE International. The hospital is also a teaching center in pediatric neurosurgery for Sub-Saharan Africa.

Location
The hospital is located in the city of Mbale, in Mbale District, in Uganda's Eastern Region. The coordinates of the hospital are 1°04'27.0"N, 34°10'18.0"E (Latitude:1.074167; Longitude:34.171667).

Overview
The CCHU is a specialized neurosurgery children's hospital owned and administered by CURE International. The hospital is privately owned and charges a fee for its services. However, CCHU serves children with physical disabilities regardless of their ethnic background, religious affiliation, or ability to pay. Opened in 2000, the hospital employs 6 doctors and 33 nurses and serves more than 7,000 outpatients annually, performing more than 1,000 operations per year. The children's neurosurgical diseases treated at the hospital include: 1. Hydrocephalus 2. Neural tube defects 3. Spina bifida 4. Epilepsy and 5. Brain tumors

Training programs
CCHU offers the following training programs in pediatric neurosurgery in collaboration with other stakeholders:

Program for advanced training in hydrocephalus

CCHU trains resident doctors in endoscopic third ventriculostomy (ETV), a procedure for the treatment of hydrocephalus, a condition characterized by the accumulation of fluid around the brain. CCHU offers a program to provide training and equipment to establish three new ETV Centers each year. iPATH Fellows train at CCHU for three months and, upon completion of their training, establish a center for the surgical treatment of hydrocephalus in their own country. CCHU provides approximately US$30,000 worth of equipment for each new center. CCHU has had iPATH applicants from Ghana, Zambia, Afghanistan, Rwanda, Nepal, Senegal, Honduras, and Madagascar. The first iPATH Fellow to graduate from the program practices in western Tanzania, in a CCHU-aided pediatric neurosurgery center.

Comprehensive epilepsy program of Uganda and East Africa

In collaboration with the West Virginia University School of Medicine, CCHU established in 2005 a comprehensive epilepsy program for Uganda and Eastern Africa. The program aims to: (a) Identify, evaluate and treat Ugandans with epilepsy. (b) Train African physicians in the evaluation and treatment of epilepsy (c) Conduct research on the causes of epilepsy in Africa and best practices for treatment.

Neurosurgeons Benjamin Warf and Warren Boling of West Virginia University performed the first three epilepsy surgeries ever done in the region. The program in ongoing and is being evaluated for further expansion.

Pediatric neurosurgical fellowship
With the encouragement and support of international neurosurgical societies, CCHU has established a fellowship program for pediatric neurosurgeons. It is the only such program in Sub-Saharan Africa. Two neurosurgeons per year will study and work at CCHU, to focus their skills on children and to concentrate on a range of afflictions of the brain and central nervous system.

See also
Hospitals in Uganda
Entebbe Children's Surgical Hospital

References

External links
 Cure Children's Hospital of Uganda Opened in 2000
 CCHU Only Specialized Children's Neurosurgery Hospital in Sub-Saharan Africa
 A cure at the mountain top As at 30 October 2008.

Hospital buildings completed in 2000
Hospitals in Uganda
Mbale
Mbale District
Hospitals established in 2000
2000 establishments in Uganda